The Mount Massive Wilderness is a federally designated wilderness area in the Sawatch Range, located in the U.S. state of Colorado. It is operated jointly by the United States Forest Service and the Fish and Wildlife Service as part of the San Isabel National Forest and the Leadville National Fish Hatchery. The name comes from Mount Massive, the second highest peak in Colorado, located inside the wilderness. It is the only federally designated wilderness area within the National Fish Hatchery System.

On the west side, the Continental Divide separates the Mount Massive Wilderness from the
Hunter-Fryingpan Wilderness, part of the White River National Forest.

Trailheads accessing the wilderness are:
 Hagerman Pass Road – The Colorado Trail, Native Lake and Windsor Lake Trailhead
 US Fish Hatchery – The Rock Creek Trailhead
 Halfmoon Creek Trailhead – Mt. Elbert/Mt. Massive Trailhead and the North Halfmoon Lake Trailhead

Regulations/Prohibitions
 Having more than 15 persons in any one group
 Having more than a combination of 25 people and pack or saddle animals in any one stock group
 Possessing dogs, except for working stock dogs, or dogs used for legal hunting purposes, unless under physical restraint of a leash.
 Camping within one hundred feet of developed trails.  
 Building, maintaining, attending, or using a campfire, within 100 feet of lakes, streams and forest development trails.
 Hitching, hobbling or tethering any pack or saddle animal within one hundred (100) feet of lakes, streams and forest development trails.
 Short-cutting a switchback on a forest development trail.

References

Further reading
Maps:
 San Isabel National Forest Map
 Trails Illustrated Independence Pass and Holy Cross maps
 USGS Homestake, Mount Massive, and Mount Champion quadrangles

External links
 Mount Massive Wilderness: Forest Service official site
 Mount Massive Wilderness on TopoQuest
 

Protected areas of Lake County, Colorado
Wilderness areas of Colorado
Protected areas established in 1980
San Isabel National Forest